Samseon-dong is a dong, neighbourhood of Seongbuk-gu in Seoul, South Korea.

See also 
Administrative divisions of South Korea

References

External links
 Seongbuk-gu Official site in English
 Map of Seongbuk-gu
 Seongbuk-gu Official website
 Samseon-dong Resident office 

Neighbourhoods of Seongbuk District